Haid may refer to:

People 
 Charles Haid (b. 1943), an American actor and director
 Grit Haid (1900–1938), an Austrian stage and film actress, the sister of Liane Haid
 Herenaus Haid (1784–1873), a German Catholic clergyman, teacher, catechist and author
 Johann Elias Haid (1739–1809), a German engraver and portraitiste, the son of Johann Jacob Haid
 Johann Jacob Haid (1704–1767), a German engraver from Augsbourg, the father of Johann Elias Haid
 Kadra Mahamoud Haid, wife of Ismaïl Omar Guelleh, President of Djibouti
 Leo Haid (1849–1924), an American Benedictine abbot and Catholic bishop
 Liane Haid (1895–2000), an Austrian actress, first Austrian movie star, the sister of Grit Haid

Places
 Fays, a hamlet located in Ciney

See also 
 Heid (disambiguation)
 Head